Luis Marcano (29 September 1831-16 May 1870) was a Dominican general of the pre-independence Cuban Army during the Ten Years' War.

Biography
Luis Jerónimo Marcano Álvarez was born in Baní, Dominican Republic in 1831, and he served in the militias which repelled the Haitian invasions of the 1840s and 1850s; he rose to the rank of Lieutenant-Colonel. He later served in the Spanish Army during the Dominican Restoration War, and, after the Dominicans won the war, Marcano and his two brothers fled to Spanish Cuba. However, they joined the Cuban rebels during the Ten Years' War, and Marcano became a Major-General in the Cuban Army. He took part in the 1868 capture of Bayamo and the 1869 Battle of El Sallado, and, on 16 May 1870, he was shot in the groin by a stranger in Manzanillo after a fight.

People of the Ten Years' War
Dominican Republic military personnel
1831 births
1870 deaths
People from Baní